Hajji Kola-ye Bala may refer to:
 Hajji Kola-ye Bala, Babol
 Hajji Kola-ye Bala, Mahmudabad